Ivanovka is a rural locality (a selo) in Progressovskoye Rural Settlement, Paninsky District, Voronezh Oblast, Russia. The population was 107 as of 2010.

References 

Rural localities in Paninsky District